Long County or Longxian is a county of Baoji, in the west of Shaanxi province, China, bordering Gansu province to the north and west.

History
Longxian was formerly known as Longzhou (陇州), and named for being east of Longshan, which is the southern part of the Liupan mountain range between Baoji and Guyuan, Ningxia. It used to be the capital of King Zhuangxiang of Qin

Geography
The county is 60% covered by forests and considered an important water source for the region with 49 streams and rivers.

Climate

Economy
Longxian is known for goat milk, walnuts, apples and honey.

Administrative divisions
Longxian administers 10 towns which include 104 incorporated villages.
Towns

References

 
County-level divisions of Shaanxi
Baoji